The All India Samathuva Makkal Katchi (AISMK) is a Tamil political party in India. The party's founder and president is actor R. Sarathkumar. Kumar was a part of DMK in his early political career and then joined All India Anna Dravida Munnetra Kazhagam (AIADMK). Later he quit AIADMK and he started his own political party, the All India Samathuva Makkal Katchi on 31 August 2007. In 2011 Assembly elections, it contested as a part of the AIADMK alliance and won in two assembly constituencies – Tenkasi and Nanguneri. Sarathkumar won from Tenkasi and Ernavur A. Narayanan won from Nanguneri. C.Raja (Regional Head, Chennai). In just before 2011 Assembly elections he joined in AIADMK alliance and his party was  allotted two seats. He won election in the Tenkasi Constituency  in 2011 Assembly elections.

2011 Assembly elections
It contested as part of the AIADMK alliance and won in two assembly constituencies – Tenkasi and Nanguneri. Sarathkumar won from Tenkasi and Ernavur A. Narayanan won from Nanguneri. C. Raja (Regional Head, Chennai).

Party flag 
The red color on top is for labour and revolution. The yellow below is for auspiciousness. The star inside the red color symbolizes the radiant sun spreading light all over the world.

References

External links
 All India Samathuva Makkal Katchi Party Official website

Political parties in Tamil Nadu
2007 establishments in Tamil Nadu
Political parties established in 2007